Hello Friends may refer to:

 ¡Hello Friends!, a compilation album DJ'ed by Jack Dangers
 Hello Friends (TV series), a Hindi language sitcom 
 The catchphrase of American sportscaster of Jim Nantz